This article lists the military commanders of divided Berlin between 1945 and 1994. Following the end of World War II in Europe, the Allies divided Berlin into distinct, occupied sectors, each had its own military governor, often referred to as commandant. This practice ended officially with the German reunification in 1990, but the several military commanders were in place until as late as 1994, when the respective occupying/protective forces were withdrawn, according to the Treaty on the Final Settlement with Respect to Germany.

Commandants

American sector

British sector

French sector

Soviet sector

See also
 Cold War
 Allied-occupied Germany
 Berlin Wall
 West Berlin
 East Berlin
 Berlin border crossings
 United States Army Berlin (for the American forces in the city)
 Berlin Brigade
 Berlin Infantry Brigade (for the British forces in the city)
 French Forces in Berlin
 6th Separate Guards Motor Rifle Brigade (for the Soviet forces in the city)

References

Further reading
 

Commandants Of Berlin Sectors
Commandants Of Berlin Sectors
Berlin Sectors, Commandants
Commandants Of Berlin Sectors
Berlin Sectors, Commandants